Martin Benetović (1550-1607) was a playwright, painter and organist.

Biography
Benetović was born on the island of Hvar to a commoner Croatian family. He started playing organs on public fairs. From 1589 to 1601 he was the main organist of a cathedral. He painted a cycle of 6 scenes portraying Christ's torment in the choir of the Francisian church on Hvar. He died in Venice while working as a representative of the commoner congregation. His most notable comedy is Hvarkinja.

Works
Hvarkinja
Komedija od Raskota
Prigovaranje pod Križišćem u Plamah meu Bogdanom
Raskotom lovčarom vrhu Brušanah

External links
http://www.enciklopedija.hr/natuknica.aspx?id=6898

http://hbl.lzmk.hr/clanak.aspx?id=1717

https://radio.hrt.hr/treci-program/ep/martin-benetovic-hvarkinja/245478/

1550 births
1607 deaths
Croatian painters
Croatian organists